Ask A Ninja is a series of comedy videos about the image of ninja in popular culture available in podcast and vodcast form, as well as in mov and WMV file formats. The episodes were released between 2005 and 2011.

In December 2007, television industry trade magazine TelevisionWeek (www.tvweek.com) reported that Ask a Ninja creators Kent Nichols and Douglas Sarine made about $100,000 a month in ad revenue and income from merchandising and licensing from the show. In January 2007 Forbes listed The Ninja as one of the top "Fictional Celebrities" on the web.

Overview
The series, created by Los Angeles improvisational comedians Kent Nichols and Douglas Sarine, features a ninja who answers e-mails from "viewers" (a similar format to Ask Zorbak and Strong Bad Email, which was an influence on Ask A Ninja's creators according to Kent Nichols). According to an interview, Ask A Ninja was originally supposed to be an animated show about two Ninjas living in Orange County.

Podcast 
The episodes feature constant and erratic camera-angle changes, as well as enthusiastic and wild hand gestures by the Ninja. Each episode usually ranges from four to seven minutes, usually ending with Ninja's signature remark to each questioner: "I look forward to killing you soon!" New episodes had been released bi-weekly during the height of the podcast's popularity. Starting with Episode 23, "Ninternships", the behind-the-scenes-team decided to have sponsors for their episodes.

Although episodes 1 to 16 are answered by Ninja in front of a featureless blue background, the action sometimes goes to other places, such as inside a car or another house. Episodes after the "Ninja Omnibus" episode use the Ninja edited onto a red circle gradient background, and episodes after the "BBQ" episode changed to blue.

The episodes start with the song "I Am Ninja", performed by The Neu Tickles and written by satirist Brently Heilbron.

Re-launch
After a nearly two-year hiatus, during which time only specials were released, the web series relaunched in October 2010 as a daily series with new videos each week day. The new lineup featured an experimental sketch show along with a weekly wrap up show (The Stare) and a showcase of emerging web shows liked by the Ninja.  Web series producer Brett Register, creator of The Crew, A Good Knight's Quest and Craig & The Werewolf, was hired on as the new day-to-day producer-director for Ask a Ninja. This run concluded in December 2011.

In 2014, five of the earliest episodes were re-performed and released as Ask a Ninja reMASTERed.

In 2015, nine episodes featuring jokes about ninjas submitted by fans were produced as NinJokes.

Advertising and other appearances
Ask A Ninja has widespread popular appeal, and has appeared in numerous media outlets.

Douglas Sarine was once asked to report as a guest film critic on National Public Radio's show, All Things Considered; his review there of Pirates of the Caribbean: Dead Man's Chest is classified as a special delivery episode. In a 5- to 10-minute piece Ask A Ninja interviewed Blades of Glory stars Will Ferrell and Jon Heder for which he asked a series of movie related questions. At the end of the interview he ice skates circles around Olympic gold medalist Scott Hamilton. One notable episode was shot in the MythBusters warehouse with Jamie and Adam, where he disputed the theory of gravity, but when asked for proof, claimed he would have to perform a move in which he would simultaneously pull out both their brains.
 
At the end of older episodes, the Ninja advertised the Ninja-Mart Store, where viewers may buy "Ask A Ninja"-related merchandise. More recent episodes have ended with Ninja advertising Ask A Ninja's first DVD release in the style of HeadOn commercials. He's also advertised The Simpsons Game as well as Doritos. Ask a Ninja also started hosting their videos with CastFire's video hosting service, likely to add to their monetization strategy.

Recently, Nichols and Sarine appeared as commentators on VH1's Best Week Ever. The Ninja, however, does not appear with them. The Ninja appears alongside Margaret Cho in Liam Kyle Sullivan's "Let Me Borrow That Top" music video. The Ninja has also appeared as a judge on Yahoo's talent-show contest.

On April 11, 2007 episode of The Showbiz Show, the Ninja, in a pre-recorded segment, provided a short review of the first episode of the final season of The Sopranos.

Jessica Lee Rose appeared with Ninja in an episode called "Jessica Lee Rose" to celebrate his series' 50th episode anniversary and to comment on the death of lonelygirl15. Vodcast Bikini News featured an extensive interview with Nichols (against the familiar Ask A Ninja background) discussing the origins of the show.

Day of the Ninja involvement
Since 2006, Ask a Ninja has been involved in organizing and coordinating events for the annual Day of the Ninja, December 5.

On December 5, 2006, the Ninja made his first live onstage appearance at the Ask a Ninja DVD Release Party, where he played the guitar after opening act The Neu Tickles. The Ninja made his second live stage appearance at the El Rey Theatre on December 5, 2007 with Patton Oswalt and Hard 'n Phirm. On December 5, 2007, The Ninja guest starred on Attack of the Show alongside Olivia Munn on G4 while Kevin was on the road hosting live from people's homes.

Other releases
 The DVD of Ask a Ninja was released on December 5, 2006. In addition to 30 episodes of Ask a Ninja, it includes commentaries, Easter eggs and bonus shorts.
 Kent Nichols and Douglas Sarine have written an Ask a Ninja book (The Ninja Handbook: This Book Looks Forward to Killing You Soon).
 Ask a Ninja has also been released to Xbox Live Marketplace.

Episodes

Special deliveries

NinJokes

See also
Ninja
Real Ultimate Power
YouTube celebrities

References

External links 

 
 Podcast interview with Kent Nichols and Ben Stiller (Feb. 22, 2006 – 11min.48sec. 5.47MB) (Businessweek.com)
 Interview with Kent Nichols about the origins and success of Ask A Ninja on Bikini News Podcast
 Video interview of Kent Nichols and Douglas Sarine by Zadi Diaz of EPIC FU, weekly web show that covers online pop culture (October 14, 2008)

2005 web series debuts
2011 web series endings
American comedy web series
Ninja parody
Japan in non-Japanese culture